Erinacines are natural substances isolated from Hericium erinaceus. They belong to the group of cyathin diterpenoids (erinacines A-K, P, and Q) and are subjects of pharmacological research.

Erinacine A
Erinacine A, isolated from the cultured mycelia of Hericium erinaceus, the main representative of this compounds group, has an enhancing effect on nerve growth factor synthesis in vitro. It also increases catecholamine in the central nervous system of rats. Hericenones and erinacines were isolated from the fruiting body and mycelium of H. erinaceus, respectively, and most of the compounds promote NGF biosynthesis in rodent cultured astrocytes. Among its active compounds, only erinacine A has confirmed pharmacological actions in the central nervous system in rats. Hence, this review has summarized the available information on the neurohealth properties of H. erinaceus mycelia enriched with erinacines, which may contribute to further research on the therapeutic roles of these mycelia. The safety of this mushroom has also been discussed. Although it has been difficult to extrapolate the in vivo studies to clinical situations, preclinical studies have shown that there can be improvements in ischemic stroke, Parkinson's disease, Alzheimer's disease, and depression if H. erinaceus mycelia enriched with erinacines are included in daily meals. Decreased levels of proinflammatory cytokines and inducible NO synthase (iNOS), however, have been detected in ischemic neurons after mycelia exposure. 

Erinacine A has also been prepared by total synthesis.

Erinacine E
Erinacine E is a kappa opioid receptor agonist.

References

Further reading

Diterpenes
Kappa-opioid receptor agonists
Isopropyl compounds